The Cape Verdi (sometimes known as the Cape Verdi Stakes), is a horse race run over a distance of 1,600 metres (one mile) on turf in late January or early February at Meydan Racecourse in Dubai. The race is named after Cape Verdi, a horse who won the 1000 Guineas for Godolphin in 1998. The race is restricted to female racehorses aged at least four years old, although three-year-olds bred in the southern hemisphere are also qualified.

It was first contested in 2004 at Nad Al Sheba Racecourse before being transferred to Meydan in 2010.

The Cape Verdi began as an ungraded race before being elevated to Listed class in 2006. The race was elevated to Group 3 level in 2009 and became a Group 2 event in 2011.

Records
Record time:
1:34.84 - Magic Lily 2020

Most wins by a jockey:
 4 - James Doyle 2016, 2019, 2020, 2021

Most wins by a trainer:
 5 - Saeed bin Suroor 2011, 2013, 2016, 2017, 2018

Most wins by an owner:
 9 - Godolphin Racing 2011, 2013, 2014, 2015, 2017, 2018, 2019, 2020, 2021

Winners

See also
 List of United Arab Emirates horse races

References

Racing Post:

Horse races in the United Arab Emirates
Recurring events established in 2004
Nad Al Sheba Racecourse
2004 establishments in the United Arab Emirates